Martin Osei Nyarko (born March 13, 1985, in Amanfoo) is a Ghanaian footballer who played as a striker for King Faisal Babes.

Career 
Nyarko began his career at Prempeh College (Class of '2005, Aggrey House) where he was named team captain. He won the Ashanti Regional Milo Championship and the National Milo Championship. In 2005, he was named as Sportsman of the Year On 21 February 2006 he joined Bofoakwa Tano, and had been considered by Berekum Arsenal and King Faisal Babes. Apio left after one year Bofoakwa Tano and signed with Kaaseman F.C. in Winter 2006/2007. On 11 June 2008 left Kaaseman F.C. and signed with Ghana Premier League club King Faisal Babes.

Titles 
2005: Ashanti Regional Milo Championship
2005: Sportsman of the Year
2005: National Milo Championship

References 

1985 births
Living people
Ghanaian footballers
Bofoakwa Tano F.C. players
King Faisal Babes FC players
Association football forwards